Wim Groenendijk (14 August 1910 – 27 November 1977) was a Dutch footballer. He played in one match for the Netherlands national football team in 1930.

References

External links
 

1910 births
1977 deaths
Dutch footballers
Netherlands international footballers
Place of birth missing
Association footballers not categorized by position